The 1987 Central Michigan Chippewas football team represented Central Michigan University in the Mid-American Conference (MAC) during the 1987 NCAA Division I-A football season. In their 10th season under head coach Herb Deromedi, the Chippewas compiled a 5–5–1 record (3–4–1 against MAC opponents), finished in sixth place in the MAC standings, and outscored their opponents, 222 to 203. The team played its home games in Kelly/Shorts Stadium in Mount Pleasant, Michigan, with attendance of 101,481 in five home games.

The team's statistical leaders included quarterback Marcelle Carruthers with 1,323 passing yards, tailback John Hood with 1,121 rushing yards, and wide receiver Eric Reed with 652 receiving yards. Reed received the team's most valuable player award. Five Central Michigan players (offensive tackle Joe Churches, tailback John Hood, outside linebacker Phil Zielinski, inside linebacker Chris Wise, and defensive back Howard Young) received first-team All-MAC honors.

Schedule

References

Central Michigan
Central Michigan Chippewas football seasons
Central Michigan Chippewas football